Robert Cunyngham Brown  (1867 – 7 October 1945) was a British psychologist and medical administrator.

He was a commissioner of the Board of Control for Lunacy and Mental Deficiency.

References 

1867 births
1945 deaths
British psychologists
Commanders of the Order of the British Empire